Michelle Ward (born 1976) is a female former British international track and road racing cyclist.

Cycling career
Ward became British champion in 1997 after winning the British National Scratch Championships at the 1997 British National Track Championships.

She represented England in the points race on the track, at the 1998 Commonwealth Games in Kuala Lumpur, Malaysia.

Palmarès
1997
1st Scratch, 1997 British National Track Championships
2nd Sprint, 1997 British National Track Championships
2nd Points, 1997 British National Track Championships
3rd Time Trial, 1997 British National Track Championships

1998
2nd Pursuit, 1998 British National Track Championships
3rd Points, 1998 British National Track Championships

1999
2nd Points, 1999 British National Track Championships

References

1976 births
Living people
Sportspeople from Aldershot
English track cyclists
English female cyclists
Cyclists at the 1998 Commonwealth Games
Commonwealth Games competitors for England